Otto Scheff, born Otto Sochaczewsky (December 12, 1889 – October 26, 1956) was an Austrian freestyle swimmer, water polo player, lawyer, politician, and sports official who competed in the 1906 Intercalated Games, in the 1908 Summer Olympics, and in the 1912 Summer Olympics.

Biography
Scheff was born in Berlin, he was still at school in 1906 and it was only for the intervention of the Austrian Olympic Committee he was allowed three weeks leave to compete in the 1906 Intercalated Games in Athens. At those Games he competed in three events, first up was the 1 mile freestyle race, it was a straight final with Scheff coming in third for the bronze medal behind winner Henry Taylor and second place John Arthur Jarvis both from Great Britain, three days later Scheff got revenge on the two British swimmers by winning the gold medal by two seconds in the 400 metre freestyle, he was also part of the 4×250 metre freestyle relay team, but they didn't finish the race.

Two years later he was in London for the 1908 Summer Olympics, again he entered three events, in the 400 metre freestyle he won another bronze medal and again losing to Henry Taylor, he also reached the final of the 1500 metre freestyle but didn't finish the race, he also managed to reach the semi-finals of the 100 metre freestyle.

At the 1912 Summer Olympics in Stockholm he participated in the water polo tournament as part of the Austrian team finishing in fourth place.

From 1945 to 1953 he was elected to the National Council of Austria as a member of the Austrian People's Party.

He was vice president of the Austrian Olympic Committee.

He died at Maria Enzersdorf in 1956.

His daughter Gertraud Scheff was already qualified for the 1940 Summer Olympics in Tokyo, when the games were cancelled.

Mödling named a street "Dr. Otto Scheff-Weg".

See also
 List of members of the International Swimming Hall of Fame
 List of select Jewish swimmers
 World record progression 200 metres freestyle

References

External links
 profile with picture 
 
 
 

1889 births
1956 deaths
Sportspeople from Berlin
Austrian Jews
Austrian male freestyle swimmers
Austrian male water polo players
Jewish swimmers
Olympic swimmers of Austria
Olympic water polo players of Austria
Swimmers at the 1906 Intercalated Games
Swimmers at the 1908 Summer Olympics
Water polo players at the 1912 Summer Olympics
Olympic bronze medalists for Austria
World record setters in swimming
Olympic bronze medalists in swimming
Medalists at the 1908 Summer Olympics
Medalists at the 1906 Intercalated Games